Negovantsi is a village in West Bulgaria. It is in Radomir Municipality, Pernik Province.

Geography 
Negovantsi is next to Radomir (town). The population is 100 – 120 persons.

History

Cultural and natural landmarks 
"St. Ivan Rilski" church was built in 1870.

Regular events 
The last Saturday of August is a village fair.

Villages in Pernik Province